Sepultura ("grave") is a Brazilian heavy metal band from Belo Horizonte. Formed in 1984 by brothers Max and Igor Cavalera, the band was a major force in the groove metal, thrash metal and death metal genres during the late 1980s and early 1990s, with their later experiments drawing influence from alternative metal, world music, nu metal, hardcore punk, and industrial metal. Sepultura has also been credited as one of the second wave of thrash metal acts from the late 1980s to early-to-mid-1990s.

The band has had several lineup changes throughout its -year career, with Max and Igor Cavalera departing in 1996 and 2006, respectively. Sepultura's current lineup consists of vocalist Derrick Green (who replaced Max in 1997), guitarist Andreas Kisser, bassist Paulo Jr. and drummer Eloy Casagrande (who replaced Igor's successor Jean Dolabella in 2011). Since Igor Cavalera's departure in 2006, there have been no original members left in the band. Although Paulo Jr. joined Sepultura shortly after its formation in late 1984 and is the longest serving member, he did not play on any of the band's studio albums until Chaos A.D. (1993). Kisser, who replaced onetime guitarist Jairo Guedz, has appeared on all of Sepultura's albums since their second full-length Schizophrenia (1987); he also recorded bass guitar until Chaos A.D..

Sepultura has released fifteen studio albums to date, the latest being Quadra (2020). Their most successful records are Beneath the Remains (1989), Arise (1991), Chaos A.D. (1993), and Roots (1996). Sepultura has sold over three million units in the United States and almost 20 million worldwide, gaining multiple gold and platinum records around the globe, including in countries as diverse as France, Australia, Indonesia, United States, Cyprus, and their native Brazil.

History

Formation, Bestial Devastation and Morbid Visions (1984–1986)

Sepultura was formed in 1984 in Belo Horizonte, the capital city of Minas Gerais, Brazil. The band was founded by brothers Max and Igor Cavalera, the impoverished sons of Vânia, a model, and Graciliano, a well-to-do Italian diplomat whose fatal heart attack left his family in financial ruin. Graciliano's death deeply affected his sons, inspiring them to form a band after Max heard Black Sabbath's 1972 album Black Sabbath Vol. 4 the very same day. They chose the band name Sepultura, the Portuguese word for "grave", when Max translated the lyrics of the Motörhead song "Dancing on Your Grave".

The brothers' early influences included Led Zeppelin, Black Sabbath, and Deep Purple, and metal and hard rock artists of the early 1980s, such as Van Halen, Iron Maiden, Motörhead, AC/DC, Judas Priest, Ozzy Osbourne, and V8, as well as hardcore punk acts, such as Terveet Kädet, Rattus and Discharge. They would travel to a record shop in São Paulo that mixed tapes of the latest records by American bands. Their listening habits changed dramatically after being introduced to Venom. As Igor Cavalera put it:

The Cavalera brothers started listening to more extreme metal bands at the time such as Hellhammer, Celtic Frost, Kreator, Sodom, Slayer, Megadeth, Exodus, and Exciter. They also had influences on Brazilian metal from bands like Stress, Sagrado Inferno, and Dorsal Atlântica. By 1984, they had dropped out of school. After several early membership changes, Sepultura established a stable lineup of Max on guitar, Igor on drums, lead vocalist Wagner Lamounier, and bassist Paulo Jr. Lamounier departed in March 1985 after disagreements with the band, and moved on to become the leader of the pioneering Brazilian black metal band Sarcófago. After his departure, Max took over the vocal duties. Jairo Guedes was invited to join the band as lead guitarist.

After about a year of performing, Sepultura signed to Cogumelo Records in 1985. Later that year, they released Bestial Devastation, a shared EP with fellow Brazilian band Overdose. It was recorded and self-produced in just two days. The band recorded their first full-length album, Morbid Visions, in August 1986. It contained their first hit, "Troops of Doom", which gained some media attention. The band then decided to relocate to the larger city of São Paulo.

Schizophrenia, Beneath the Remains, and Arise (1987–1992)

In early 1987, Jairo Guedz quit the band. Guedz was replaced by São Paulo-based guitarist Andreas Kisser, and they released their second studio album, Schizophrenia, later that year. The album reflected a stylistic change towards a more thrash metal-oriented sound, while still keeping the death metal elements of Morbid Visions. Schizophrenia was an improvement in production and performance, and became a minor critical sensation across Europe and America as a much sought-after import. The band sent tapes to the United States that made radio playlists at a time when they were struggling to book gigs, because club owners were afraid to book them due to their style. The band gained attention from Roadrunner Records who signed them and released Schizophrenia internationally before seeing the band perform in person.

During a May 2018 interview with teenyrockers.com, Kisser noted that Sepultura would not have been possible without family support, not only from his own family, but also from the families of Max and Igor, and Paulo Jr.

The band's third studio album, Beneath the Remains, was released in 1989. The album was recorded in a rustic studio in Rio de Janeiro while the band communicated through translators with the American producer Scott Burns. It was an immediate success and became known in thrash metal circles as a classic on the order of Slayer's Reign in Blood. It was hailed by Terrorizer magazine as one of the all-time top 20 thrash metal albums, as well as gaining a place in their all-time top 40 death metal records. AllMusic gave the album 4.5 stars out of 5 and said, "The complete absence of filler here makes this one of the most essential death/thrash metal albums of all time." A long European and American tour furthered the band's reputation, despite the fact that they were still very limited English speakers. Sepultura's first live dates outside of Brazil were opening for Sodom on their Agent Orange tour in Europe; following this was Sepultura's first U.S. show, which was held on October 31, 1989 at the Ritz in New York City, opening for Danish heavy metal band King Diamond. The band filmed its first video for the song "Inner Self", which received considerable airplay on MTV's Headbangers Ball, giving Sepultura their first exposure in North America. Touring in support of Beneath the Remains continued throughout much of 1990, including three shows in Brazil with Napalm Death, European dates with Mordred and a US tour with Obituary and Sadus.

In January 1991, Sepultura played for more than 100,000 people at the Rock in Rio II festival. The band relocated from their native Brazil to Phoenix, Arizona in 1990, obtained new management, and recorded the album Arise at Morrisound Studios in Tampa, Florida. By the time the album was released in March 1991, the band had become one of the most critically praised thrash/death metal bands of the time. The first single "Dead Embryonic Cells" was a success, and the title track gained additional attention when its video was banned by MTV America due to its apocalyptic religious imagery; it did, however, get some airplay on Headbangers Ball as did the music videos for "Dead Embryonic Cells" and "Desperate Cry". Arise was critically acclaimed and their first to chart on the Billboard 200, reaching No. 119.

Sepultura toured relentlessly throughout 1991 and 1992 in support of Arise; its touring cycle began in May 1991 with a European trek with Sacred Reich and Heathen, followed by the New Titans on the Block tour in the US that included support from Sacred Reich, Napalm Death and Sick of It All. They also played with several other bands, including Slayer, Testament, Motörhead, Kreator, White Zombie, Type O Negative and Fudge Tunnel, and along with Alice in Chains, Sepultura supported Ozzy Osbourne on his No More Tears tour. Max Cavalera married the band's manager Gloria Bujnowski during this period. The Arise tour concluded in December 1992 with a US tour, where the band (along with Helmet) supported Ministry's Psalm 69 tour.

Chaos A.D., Nailbomb and Roots (1993–1996)

Sepultura's fifth album, Chaos A.D., was released in 1993. Supported by the singles "Refuse/Resist", "Territory" and "Slave New World", this was their only album to be released in North America by Epic Records, and the first of two albums by Sepultura to be certified gold there. It saw a departure from their death metal style, adding influences of groove metal, industrial and hardcore punk. While Chaos A.D. is not a death metal album, it does include elements of thrash metal music. AllMusic gave the album 4.5 stars out of 5 and wrote that, "Chaos A.D. ranks as one of the greatest heavy metal albums of all time." The band did a year-long tour in support of Chaos A.D., starting with a headlining European run with Paradise Lost, followed by a US tour with Fudge Tunnel, Fear Factory and Clutch. They were also one of the support acts (along with Biohazard and Prong) for Pantera's Far Beyond Driven tour in North America, and then opened for the Ramones in South America and toured Australia and New Zealand with Sacred Reich. By the time the Chaos A.D. tour ended in November 1994, Sepultura was one of the most successful heavy metal bands of the day.

Also in 1994, Max and Igor collaborated with Alex Newport of Fudge Tunnel to form Nailbomb. They released an even more industrial-oriented album, Point Blank the same year. The group performed only one full live gig at Dynamo Open Air in 1995, and the performance was released as Proud to Commit Commercial Suicide. Nailbomb was disbanded shortly afterwards.

Sepultura's sound change continued with their sixth album, Roots, which was released in 1996. On this album the band experimented with elements of the music of Brazil's indigenous peoples, and adopted a slower, down-tuned sound. The album was hailed as a modern-day heavy metal classic and a major influence on the then-nascent nu metal scene. AllMusic gave it 4.5 stars out of 5 and said, "Roots consolidates Sepultura's position as perhaps the most distinctive, original heavy metal band of the 1990s." In 1996, Sepultura performed "War (Guerra)" for the AIDS benefit album Silencio=Muerte: Red Hot + Latin produced by the Red Hot Organization.

Departure of Max Cavalera, Derrick Green joins and Against (1996–2000)
In August 1996, Sepultura played on the Castle Donington Monsters of Rock main stage alongside Ozzy Osbourne, Paradise Lost, Type O Negative, Biohazard, and Fear Factory. The band was suddenly a three-piece with Andreas Kisser taking over on lead vocals, after Max Cavalera left the concert site earlier in the day upon learning of the death of his stepson Dana Wells in a car accident. After Dana Wells' funeral was finished, Max returned and continued to tour with Sepultura. A few months after Wells' death, the band had a meeting with Max and said that they wanted to fire their manager Gloria Bujnowski, who was Max's wife and Dana's mother, and find new management. Their reasoning was that Bujnowski was giving preferential treatment to Max while neglecting the rest of the band. Max, who was still coming to terms with the death of Wells, felt betrayed by his bandmates for wanting to get rid of Bujnowski and abruptly quit the band. Max Cavalera's final performance with Sepultura was at Brixton Academy in England on December 16, 1996. 

Following Max Cavalera's departure, the remaining members of Sepultura announced plans to find a new vocalist. Among those who auditioned were Chuck Billy of Testament, Phil Demmel of Machine Head and Vio-lence, Marc Grewe of Morgoth, Jorge Rosado of Merauder and a then-unknown Jason "Gong" Jones. American musician Derrick Green from Cleveland, Ohio, was selected as the band's new front-man. The first album with the new line-up was Against, which was released in 1998. The album was critically and commercially less successful than previous albums and sold considerably fewer copies than the debut album by Max Cavalera's new band Soulfly. In a retrospective review AllMusic gave the album 3 stars out of 5, stating that "there are enough flashes of the old Sepultura brilliance to suggest that great things are still to come".

Nation and Roorback (2001–2005)
The band's eighth album, Nation, released in 2001, sold poorly. It would be their last studio album with Roadrunner Records. AllMusic gives the album 3 stars out of 5 and said, "As Green scrapes the lining of his vocal chords through the brash, impassioned tracks, he's singing about more than just 'one nation, Sepulnation'; he's suggesting something bigger, something worth shouting about and fighting for." In an interview, Derrick Green said that, "Every song will be related to the idea of building this nation. We will have our own flags, our own anthem." A recording of Max Cavalera's last live show with Sepultura, titled Under a Pale Grey Sky, was released in 2002 by Roadrunner Records.

After recording Revolusongs, an EP of covers in 2002, the band released their ninth studio album, Roorback, in 2003. Despite receiving greater critical acclaim than its predecessors, sales remained low. It was their first album with SPV Records. AllMusic gave the album 4 stars out of 5 and said, "if there are still any lingering doubts about the Green/Sepultura match, 2003's excellent Roorback should put them to rest for good. Green is passionate and focused throughout the album — he has no problem going that extra mile — and the writing is consistently strong." In 2005, the band played in Dubai for the annual Dubai Desert Rock Festival. In November of that year, a live double DVD/double CD package, Live in São Paulo, was released. This was the first official live album from the band.

Dante XXI, A-Lex, and departure of Igor Cavalera (2006–2010)

Sepultura's tenth album, Dante XXI, was released on March 14, 2006. It is a concept album based on Dante Alighieri's The Divine Comedy. Music videos were recorded for the songs "Convicted in Life" and "Ostia". AllMusic gave the album 3.5 stars out of 5 and said that, "Overall, Dante XXI is easily one of Sepultura's strongest releases to feature Green on vocals."

In a 2007 interview with Revolver magazine, Max Cavalera stated that he and Igor, both of whom having recently reconciled after a decade-long feud, would reunite with the original Sepultura lineup. There were also rumors that the reunited line up would play on the main stage at Ozzfest 2007. However, this was denied by Kisser and the reunion did not occur. Instead, Igor Cavalera left the band after the release of Dante XXI and was replaced by Brazilian drummer Jean Dolabella, leaving the band without any of its original members. After leaving Sepultura, Igor and Max formed Cavalera Conspiracy.

The band was one of the featured musical guests at the Latin Grammy Awards of 2008 on November 13. They performed a cover of "The Girl from Ipanema", and "We've Lost You" from the album A-Lex. The 9th annual Latin Grammy Awards ceremony was held at the Toyota Center in Houston, Texas and aired on Univision. Sepultura also appeared in a successful ad campaign for Volkswagen motors commercial that aired nationally throughout Brazil in 2008. The spot said that "it's the first time you've seen Sepultura like this. And a Sedan like this one too". The Volkswagen TV spot shows Sepultura playing bossa nova, the opposite of its heavy metal style, to say that "you never saw something like this, as you never saw a car like the new Voyage."

Sepultura released the album A-Lex on January 26, 2009. This was the first Sepultura album to include neither of the Cavalera brothers, with bassist Paulo Jr. as the sole remaining member from the band's debut album. A-Lex is a concept album based on the book A Clockwork Orange. The album was recorded at Trama Studios in São Paulo, Brazil, with producer Stanley Soares. AllMusic gave the album 4 stars out of 5 and said, "Personnel changes can have a very negative effect on a band, but Sepultura have maintained their vitality all these years – and that vitality is alive and well on the superb A-Lex." In the same year Andreas Kisser contributed his recipe for "Churrasco in Soy Sauce" to Hellbent for Cooking: The Heavy Metal Cookbook, stating in the recipe that he prefers his meat "medium-rare". Sepultura supported Metallica on January 30 and 31, 2010, at Morumbi Stadium in São Paulo, Brazil. The two concerts were attended by 100,000 people. The band filmed a concert DVD in 2010. Sepultura played at Kucukciftlik Park, Istanbul, on April 27, 2010. On August 8, 2010 visited the UK to play at the Hevy Music Festival near Folkestone.

Kairos and The Mediator Between Head and Hands Must Be the Heart (2010–2015)

On July 6, 2010, it was announced that Sepultura were signed with Nuclear Blast Records, and would release their first album for the label in 2011. The band confirmed that there would be no reunion of the classic lineup. By the end of 2010, the band began writing new material and entered the studio to begin recording their 12th album with producer Roy Z (Judas Priest, Halford, Iron Maiden's Bruce Dickinson, Helloween and Andre Matos). On March 1, 2011, Sepultura had completed recording their new album, entitled Kairos, which was released in June 2011.

The album includes cover versions of Ministry's "Just One Fix" and The Prodigy's "Firestarter", both of which are available as bonus tracks on various special-edition releases. Sepultura played on the Kairos World Tour and at Wacken Open Air 2011. Drummer Jean Dolabella left the band and was replaced by 20-year-old Eloy Casagrande in November 2011, who had already played in Brazilian heavy metal singer Andre Matos' solo band and in the Brazilian post-hardcore band Gloria. In November and December 2011 Sepultura participated the Thrashfest Classics 2011 tour alongside thrash metal bands like Exodus, Destruction, Heathen, and Mortal Sin.

In May 2012, guitarist Andreas Kisser told Metal Underground that Sepultura would soon "start working on something new with Eloy" and see if they could "get ready for new music early next year". In an interview at England's Bloodstock Open Air on August 10, 2012, Kisser revealed that Sepultura would be filming a live DVD with the French percussive group Les Tambours du Bronx. He also revealed that the band was "already thinking about new ideas" for their next album and would "have something new going on" in 2013.

On December 10, 2012, producer Ross Robinson, who produced Sepultura's Roots album, tweeted: "Oh, didn't mention.. Spoke to Andreas, it's on. My vision, smoke Roots"  suggesting he would be producing the band's next album. This was later confirmed, as well as an announcement that the album would be co-produced by Steve Evetts. Former Slayer drummer Dave Lombardo made a guest appearance on the album.

On January 25, 2013, it was announced that author Jason Korolenko was working on Relentless – 30 Years of Sepultura, which is described in a press release as "the only book-length biography to cover the band's entire 30-year career." Relentless was published on October 8, 2014 in Poland under the title Brazylijska Furia, and the English language edition was published via Rocket 88 on December 4, 2014. The Brazilian edition, titled Relentless – 30 Anos de Sepultura, is scheduled for publication via Benvira in early 2015. The French language edition of "Relentless" was published in France on October 19, 2015.

On July 19, 2013, it was revealed that the title of the band's thirteenth album was The Mediator Between Head and Hands Must Be the Heart. In September 2013, they performed at Rock in Rio with Brazilian rock/MPB artist Zé Ramalho – this line-up was named "Zépultura", a portmanteau of both artists' names.

Machine Messiah, Quadra and upcoming sixteenth studio album (2016–present)
After spending more than two years of touring in support of The Mediator Between Head and Hands Must Be the Heart, Sepultura entered the studio in mid-2016 to begin recording their fourteenth studio album, with Jens Bogren as the producer. The resulting album, Machine Messiah, was released on January 13, 2017. Sepultura promoted the album with a series of world tours, including supporting Kreator on their Gods of Violence tour in Europe in February–March 2017, and along with Prong, they supported Testament on the latter's Brotherhood of the Snake tour in the United States in April–May 2017. The band also toured Europe in February and March 2018 with Obscura, Goatwhore and Fit for an Autopsy, and Australia in May with Death Angel.

The first official Sepultura documentary, Sepultura Endurance, was premiered in May 2017 and released on June 17. Max and Igor declined to be interviewed for the film and also refused to allow early material of the band to be used.

In an August 2018 interview at Wacken Open Air, Kisser confirmed that Sepultura had begun the songwriting process of their fifteenth studio album, and stated later that month that it was not expected to be released before 2020. The band began recording the album, again with producer Bogren, in August 2019 for a tentative February 2020 release.

In October 2019, during their performance at Rock in Rio 8, the band announced the name and revealed the cover for their fifteenth studio album, which would be named Quadra. They also played the lead single, named "Isolation", which is also the opening track for the album. On November 8, they released the studio version of "Isolation" and announced that Quadra would be released on February 7, 2020. Due to the COVID-19 pandemic, Sepultura had not been able to tour or play any shows in support of Quadra for over two years after its release. They played their first show in two years at Circo Voador in Rio de Janeiro on February 12, 2022. The band promoted Quadra by touring the United States with Sacred Reich, Crowbar and Art of Shock, and Europe with the two-thirds of US leg (only Sacred Reich and Crowbar remaining); due to the COVID-19 situation, the tours had been rescheduled to two years from March and April 2020 and a year from the fall of 2021 respectively. Drummer Bruno Valverde of Angra was brought to fill in for Eloy Casagrande on the last three dates of the US tour, as the latter could not perform due to a leg injury. Due to a "family emergency", Kisser was temporarily filled in by Jean Patton of Project46 on the summer 2022 European tour; the reason behind this "family emergency" situation turned out to be Kisser's wife Patricia's battle with colon cancer, which she died from on July 3. The band will co-headline the Klash of the Titans tour in North America with Kreator during the spring of 2023.

Sepultura released a quarantine collaboration album on August 13, 2021, titled SepulQuarta, which includes contributions by members of Megadeth, Testament, Anthrax, System of a Down, Trivium and Sacred Reich.

In a July 2022 interview, frontman Derrick Green confirmed that Sepultura would begin working on their next studio album after the tour for Quadra ends, in 2024 at the earliest.

Musical style, influences, and legacy
Sepultura has been influenced by a variety of music, including heavy metal and hard rock groups such as Queen, Kiss, Black Sabbath, Judas Priest, Motörhead, Iron Maiden, Scorpions, Venom, Celtic Frost, Twisted Sister and Whitesnake, thrash metal bands Metallica, Slayer, Megadeth, Exodus, Testament, Anthrax, Kreator, Sodom and Destruction and death metal bands Possessed and Death. They were also influenced by punk rock music, including bands such as the Ramones, the Sex Pistols, Terveet Kädet, Rattus, Black Flag, Dead Kennedys, Kaaos, Discharge, S.O.D., Amebix and New Model Army. Andreas Kisser has affirmed that "without Slayer, Sepultura would never be possible."

Sepultura's music comes in a wide range of heavy metal musical styles. The band has been described mainly as thrash metal and death metal, and considered one of the primary inventors of the latter genre. Another genre the band has been commonly categorized under is groove metal. The band later on started experimenting with elements of other musical genres such as hardcore punk, industrial metal, alternative metal, world music and nu metal.

Elements of Latin music, samba and Brazilian folk and tribal music have also been incorporated into Sepultura's metal style, particularly on Roots. Roots was partly recorded with the indigenous Xavante tribe in Mato Grosso, and incorporates percussion, rhythms, chanting and lyrical themes inspired by the collaboration.

Looking back on the band's career arc for a 2016 article on Max and Igor Cavalera's retrospective Return to Roots tour (in commemoration of the album's 20th anniversary), Nashville Scene contributor Saby Reyes-Kulkarni observed that "Before Chaos A.D., the overwhelming majority of metal had a 'white' feel to it. Sepultura changed that forever. And with Roots, the band went a step further, asserting once and for all that the genre can accommodate native stylings from any culture, much like jazz had done for decades prior."

MTV has called Sepultura the most successful Brazilian heavy metal band in history and "perhaps the most important heavy metal band of the '90s." In 1993, Robert Baird of Phoenix New Times wrote that the band played "machine-gun-tempo mayhem" and that the members "love to attack organized religion and repressive government."

A number of bands have cited Sepultura as an influence, including Slipknot, Korn, Hatebreed, Alien Weaponry, Krisiun, Gojira, Between the Buried and Me, Xibalba, Vein, Toxic Holocaust, Code Orange, Puya and Nails.

Band members

Current members
 Paulo Jr. – bass, backing vocals (1984–present); percussion (1993–1997)
 Andreas Kisser – lead guitar, backing vocals (1987–present); lead vocals (1996–1998); bass (1987–1992); rhythm guitar (1996–present)
 Derrick Green – lead vocals (1997–present); percussion (2005–present); additional rhythm guitar (1998–2005)
 Eloy Casagrande – drums, percussion (2011–present)

Former members
 Max Cavalera – lead vocals (1985–1996); rhythm guitar (1984, 1985–1996); lead guitar (1984–1985); percussion (1995–1996)
 Igor Cavalera – drums (1984–2006); percussion (1984, 1993–2006)
 Cássio – rhythm guitar (1984)
 Beto Pinga – drums (1984)
 Wagner Lamounier – lead vocals  (1984–1985)
 Roberto "Gato" Raffan – bass (1984)
 Roberto UFO – rhythm guitar (1984)
 Julio Cesar Vieira Franco – rhythm guitar (1985)
 Jairo Guedz – lead guitar, bass (1985–1987)
 Jean Dolabella – drums, percussion (2006–2011)

Touring substitutes
 Silvio Golfetti – lead guitar (1991)
 Guilherme Martin – drums (2005)
 Roy Mayorga – drums (2006)
 Amilcar Christófaro – drums (2011)
 Kevin Foley – drums (2013)
 Bruno Valverde – drums  (2022)
 Jean Patton – lead guitar  (2022)

Timeline

Discography

 Morbid Visions (1986)
 Schizophrenia (1987)
 Beneath the Remains (1989)
 Arise (1991)
 Chaos A.D. (1993)
 Roots (1996)
 Against (1998)
 Nation (2001)
 Roorback (2003)
 Dante XXI (2006)
 A-Lex (2009)
 Kairos (2011)
 The Mediator Between Head and Hands Must Be the Heart (2013)
 Machine Messiah (2017)
 Quadra (2020)

Notes

References

Bibliography
Anonymous (May 2003). Beneath the Remains. In: A Megaton Hit Parade: The All-Time Thrash Top 20. Terrorizer No. 109, page 35.
Barcinski, André & Gomes, Silvio (1999). Sepultura: Toda a História. São Paulo: Ed. 34. 
Colmatti, Andréa (1997). Sepultura: Igor Cavalera. Modern Drummer Brasil, 6, 18–26, 28–30.
Hinchliffe, James (December 2006). Beneath the Remains. In: Death Metal|The DM Top 40. Terrorizer No. 151, page 54.
Lemos, Anamaria (1993). Caos Desencanado. Bizz, 98, 40–45.
Schwarz, Paul (2005). Morbid Visions. In: The First Wave. Terrorizer, 128, 42.
Sepultura (1996). Roots. [CD]. New York, NY: Roadrunner Records. The 25th Anniversary Series (2-CD Reissue, 2005).

External links

 

 
Brazilian thrash metal musical groups
Brazilian death metal musical groups
English-language musical groups from Brazil
Roadrunner Records artists
Musical groups established in 1984
Musical groups from Belo Horizonte
Alternative metal musical groups
Musical quartets
Groove metal musical groups
Brazilian heavy metal musical groups
Nuclear Blast artists
Articles which contain graphical timelines
1984 establishments in Brazil